The yellow frog is a species of frog in the family Ranidae found in Cambodia, Laos, Myanmar, Thailand, and Vietnam.

Yellow frog may also refer to:

 Bahia yellow frog, a frog endemic to Brazil
 Venezuelan yellow frog, a frog endemic to Venezuela
 Yellow bromeliad frog, a frog endemic to Jamaica

See also

 Yellow bush frog (disambiguation)
 Yellow tree frog (disambiguation)
 Yellow-legged frog (disambiguation)
 Yellow-throated frog

Animal common name disambiguation pages